Staniszewski (feminine Staniszewska) is a Polish surname. Notable people with the surname include:

 Daniel Staniszewski (born 1997), Polish cyclist
 Grażyna Staniszewska (born 1949), Polish politician
 Michał Staniszewski (born 1973), Polish canoer

Polish-language surnames